The Men's junior time trial of the 2012 UCI Road World Championships was a cycling event that took place on 17 September 2012 in Limburg, the Netherlands.

Final classification

References 

Men's junior time trial
UCI Road World Championships – Men's junior time trial